Yesubai Bhosale (born Jivubai Shirke) was the wife of Chhatrapati Sambhaji Maharaj, also referred as Maharani, of the Maratha Empire. Maharani Yesubai was Fearless and Strong Queen Of Maratha Empire who Defended The Holy Kingdom of Swarajya even after the death of Dharmaveer Shree Chatrapati Sambhaji Maharaj before she was captured.

References 

Indian royalty
Indian royal consorts
17th-century Indian people
18th-century Indian people
1730 deaths
Year of birth unknown